The 2010–11 New York Knicks was the 65th season of the New York Knicks in the National Basketball Association (NBA).

With the respective offseason and midseason acquisitions of Amar'e Stoudemire and Carmelo Anthony, the Knicks returned to the playoffs for the first time since 2004 and achieved their first winning season since 2000–01. However, without fellow midseason acquisition Chauncey Billups for the rest of the season after suffering a knee injury, the Knicks would go on to be swept in four games by the Boston Celtics.

Key dates
June 24 – The 2010 NBA draft took place in New York City.
July 1 – The free agency period started.

Draft picks

Roster

!colspan="7"|Players who left during the season
|-

Pre-season

Game log

|- bgcolor="#ccffcc"
| 1
| October 3
| @ Olimpia Milano
| 
| Amar'e Stoudemire (32)
| Danilo Gallinari (7)
| Raymond Felton (8)
| Mediolanum Forum10,672
| 1–0
|- bgcolor="#ffcccc"
| 2
| October 6
| @ Minnesota
| 
| Anthony Randolph (14)
| Danilo Gallinari,Ronny Turiaf,Roger Mason (6)
| Raymond Felton (4)
| Palais Omnisports de Paris-Bercy15,532
| 1–1
|- bgcolor="#ffcccc"
| 3
| October 13
| Boston
| 
| Amar'e Stoudemire (30)
| Danilo Gallinari,Anthony Randolph (6)
| Raymond Felton (6)
| Madison Square Garden19,763
| 1–2
|- bgcolor="#ffcccc"
| 4
| October 16
| @ Boston
| 
| Danilo Gallinari (20)
| Landry Fields (7)
| Raymond Felton,Toney Douglas (5)
| XL Center15,318
| 1–3
|- bgcolor="ccffcc"
| 5
| October 17
| Washington
| 
| Toney Douglas (23)
| Ronny Turiaf (8)
| Raymond Felton (8)
| Madison Square Garden18,792
| 2–3
|- bgcolor="#ccffcc"
| 6
| October 19
| New Jersey
| 
| Amar'e Stoudemire (39)
| Amar'e Stoudemire (11)
| Raymond Felton (11)
| Madison Square Garden18,895
| 3–3
|- bgcolor="#ffcccc"
| 7
| October 20
| @ Philadelphia
| 
| Raymond Felton (16)
| Timofey Mozgov (7)
| Toney Douglas (9)
| Wells Fargo Center6,473
| 3–4
|- bgcolor="#ffcccc"
| 8
| October 22
| @ Toronto
| 
| Amar'e Stoudemire (24)
| Anthony Randolph (6)
| Raymond Felton (5)
| Bell Centre22,114
| 3–5
|-

Regular season

Standings

Game log

|- bgcolor="#ccffcc"
| 1
| October 27
| @ Toronto
| 
| Wilson Chandler (22)
| Amar'e Stoudemire (10)
| Raymond Felton (6)
| Air Canada Centre18,722
| 1–0
|- bgcolor="#ffcccc"
| 2
| October 29					
| @ Boston
| 
| Amar'e Stoudemire (27)
| Landry Fields (10)
| Raymond Felton (6)
| TD Garden18,624
| 1–1
|- bgcolor="#ffcccc"
| 3
| October 30
| Portland
| 
| Wilson Chandler (22)
| Wilson Chandler (16)
| Raymond Felton (5)
| Madison Square Garden19,763
| 1–2
|-

|- bgcolor="#ccffcc"
| 4
| November 4
| @ Chicago
| 
| Toney Douglas (30)
| Amar'e Stoudemire (8)
| Raymond Felton (10)
| United Center21,203
| 2–2
|- bgcolor="#ccffcc"
| 5
| November 5
| Washington
| 
| Toney Douglas (19)
| Toney Douglas (10)
| Raymond Felton (10)
| Madison Square Garden19,763
| 3–2
|- bgcolor="#ffcccc"
| 6
| November 7
| Philadelphia
| 
| Amar'e Stoudemire (21)
| Amar'e Stoudemire (15)
| Raymond Felton (10)
| Madison Square Garden18,735
| 3–3
|- bgcolor="#ffcccc"
| 7
| November 9
| @ Milwaukee
| 
| Amar'e Stoudemire (19)
| Anthony Randolph (9)
| Raymond Felton (8)
| Bradley Center13,286
| 3–4
|- bgcolor="#ffcccc"
| 8
| November 10
| Golden State
| 
| Amar'e Stoudemire (33)
| Amar'e Stoudemire (10)
| Raymond Felton (6)
| Madison Square Garden19,763
| 3–5
|- bgcolor="#ffcccc"
| 9
| November 12
| @ Minnesota
| 
| Danilo Gallinari (25)
| Amar'e Stoudemire,Landry Fields (9)
| Raymond Felton (8)
| Target Center15,232
| 3–6
|- bgcolor="#ffcccc"
| 10
| November 14
| Houston
| 
| Amar'e Stoudemire (25)
| Amar'e Stoudemire (8)
| Raymond Felton (5)
| Madison Square Garden19,763
| 3–7
|- bgcolor="#ffcccc"
| 11
| November 16
| @ Denver
| 
| Amar'e Stoudemire (24)
| Landry Fields (17)
| Raymond Felton (11)
| Pepsi Center15,190
| 3–8
|- bgcolor="#ccffcc"
| 12
| November 17
| @ Sacramento
| 
| Amar'e Stoudemire,Danilo Gallinari (27)
| Amar'e Stoudemire (10)
| Ronny Turiaf (4)
| ARCO Arena12,817
| 4–8
|- bgcolor="#ccffcc"
| 13
| November 19
| @ Golden State
| 
| Raymond Felton (35)
| Amar'e Stoudemire (11)
| Raymond Felton (11)
| Oracle Arena19,808 
| 5–8
|- bgcolor="#ccffcc"
| 14
| November 20
| @ L.A. Clippers
| 
| Amar'e Stoudemire (39)
| Amar'e Stoudemire (11)
| Raymond Felton (7)
| Staples Center18,325
| 6–8
|- bgcolor="#ccffcc"
| 15
| November 23
| Charlotte
| 
| Toney Douglas (22)
| Landry Fields,Amar'e Stoudemire (7)
| Raymond Felton (9)
| Madison Square Garden19,763
| 7–8
|- bgcolor="#ccffcc"
| 16
| November 24
| @ Charlotte
| 
| Raymond Felton (23)
| Landry Fields (10)
| Raymond Felton (13)
| Time Warner Cable Arena15,588
| 8–8
|- bgcolor="#ffcccc"
| 17
| November 27
| Atlanta
| 
| Amar'e Stoudemire (24)
| Landry Fields (11)
| Raymond Felton (4)
| Madison Square Garden19,763
| 8–9
|- bgcolor="#ccffcc"
| 18
| November 28
| @ Detroit
| 
| Amar'e Stoudemire (37)
| Amar'e Stoudemire (15)
| Raymond Felton (11)
| The Palace of Auburn Hills16,015
| 9–9
|- bgcolor="#ccffcc"
| 19
| November 30
| New Jersey
| 
| Amar'e Stoudemire (35)
| Wilson Chandler (11)
| Raymond Felton (10)
| Madison Square Garden19,763
| 10–9
|-

|- bgcolor="#ccffcc"
| 20
| December 3
| @ New Orleans
| 
| Amar'e Stoudemire (34)
| Amar'e Stoudemire (10)
| Raymond Felton (13)
| New Orleans Arena14,020 
| 11–9
|- bgcolor="#ccffcc"
| 21
| December 5
| @ Toronto
| 
| Amar'e Stoudemire (31)
| Amar'e Stoudemire (16)
| Raymond Felton (8)
| Air Canada Centre16,891
| 12–9
|- bgcolor="#ccffcc"
| 22
| December 6
| Minnesota
| 
| Amar'e Stoudemire (34)
| Landry Fields (10)
| Raymond Felton (11)
| Madison Square Garden19,763
| 13–9
|- bgcolor="#ccffcc"
| 23
| December 8
| Toronto
| 
| Amar'e Stoudemire (34)
| Amar'e Stoudemire (14)
| Raymond Felton (11)
| Madison Square Garden19,763
| 14–9
|- bgcolor="#ccffcc"
| 24
| December 10
| @ Washington
| 
| Amar'e Stoudemire (36)
| Amar'e Stoudemire (10)
| Toney Douglas (6)
| Verizon Center18,542
|  15–9
|- bgcolor="#ccffcc"
| 25
| December 12
| Denver
| 
| Amar'e Stoudemire (30)
| Landry Fields (9)
| Raymond Felton (17)
| Madison Square Garden19,387
| 16–9
|- bgcolor="#ffcccc"
| 26
| December 15
| Boston
| 
| Amar'e Stoudemire (39)
| Wilson Chandler (12)
| Raymond Felton (14)
| Madison Square Garden19,763
| 16–10
|- bgcolor="#ffcccc"
| 27
| December 17
| Miami
| 
| Danilo Gallinari (25)
| Amar'e Stoudemire (14)
| Raymond Felton (10)
| Madison Square Garden19,763
| 16–11
|- bgcolor="#ffcccc"
| 28
| December 18
| @ Cleveland
| 
| Raymond Felton,Amar'e Stoudemire (23)
| Amar'e Stoudemire (11)
| Raymond Felton (11)
| Quicken Loans Arena20,562
| 16–12
|- bgcolor="#ccffcc"
| 29
| December 22
| Oklahoma City
| 
| Amar'e Stoudemire (23)
| Landry Fields (10)
| Raymond Felton (10)
| Madison Square Garden19,763 
|  17–12
|- bgcolor="#ccffcc"
| 30
| December 25
| Chicago
| 
| Amar'e Stoudemire,Raymond Felton (20)
| Landry Fields (11)
| Raymond Felton (12)
| Madison Square Garden19,763
| 18–12
|- bgcolor="#ffcccc"
| 31
| December 28
| @ Miami
| 
| Amar'e Stoudemire (30)
| Landry Fields,Amar'e Stoudemire (7)
| Raymond Felton (5)
| American Airlines Arena20,288
| 18–13
|- bgcolor="#ffcccc"
| 32
| December 30
| @ Orlando
| 
| Amar'e Stoudemire (30)
| Wilson Chandler (9)
| Raymond Felton (6)
| Amway Center19,090
| 18–14
|-

|- bgcolor="#ccffcc"
| 33
| January 2
| Indiana
| 
| Amar'e Stoudemire (26)
| Ronny Turiaf (10)
| Toney Douglas (7)
| Madison Square Garden19,763
| 19–14
|- bgcolor="#ccffcc"
| 34
| January 4
| San Antonio
| 
| Wilson Chandler (31)
| Wilson Chandler,Amar'e Stoudemire (9)
| Raymond Felton (7)
| Madison Square Garden19,763
| 20–14
|- bgcolor="#ccffcc"
| 35
| January 7
| @ Phoenix
| 
| Amar'e Stoudemire,Raymond Felton (23)
| Raymond Felton,Landry Fields (10)
| Raymond Felton (11)
| US Airways Center17,621 
| 21–14
|- bgcolor="#ffcccc"
| 36
| January 9
| @ L.A. Lakers
| 
| Amar'e Stoudemire (23)
| Amar'e Stoudemire (10)
| Raymond Felton (7)
| Staples Center18,997
| 21–15
|- bgcolor="#ccffcc"
| 37
| January 11
| @ Portland
| 
| Amar'e Stoudemire (23)
| Ronny Turiaf (10)
| Raymond Felton (14)
| Rose Garden20,604
| 22–15
|- bgcolor="#ffcccc"
| 38
| January 12
| @ Utah
| 
| Shawne Williams (25)
| Raymond Felton (7)
| Raymond Felton (11)
| EnergySolutions Arena19,911
| 22–16
|- bgcolor="#ffcccc"
| 39
| January 14
| Sacramento
| 
| Amar'e Stoudemire (25)
| Amar'e Stoudemire (13)
| Raymond Felton (6)
| Madison Square Garden19,763
| 22–17
|- bgcolor="#ffcccc"
| 40
| January 17
| Phoenix
| 
| Amar'e Stoudemire (41)
| Landry Fields (9)
| Raymond Felton (13)
| Madison Square Garden19,763
| 22–18
|- bgcolor="#ffcccc"
| 41
| January 19
| @ Houston
| 
| Amar'e Stoudemire (25)
| Wilson Chandler (8)
| Raymond Felton (5)
| Toyota Center15,903
| 22–19
|- bgcolor="#ffcccc"
| 42
| January 21
| @ San Antonio
| 
| Raymond Felton (23)
| Amar'e Stoudemire (15)
| Raymond Felton (7)
| AT&T Center18,581
| 22–20
|- bgcolor="#ffcccc"
| 43
| January 22
| @ Oklahoma City
| 
| Danilo Gallinari (23)
| Amar'e Stoudemire (12)
| Raymond Felton (7)
| Oklahoma City Arena18,203
| 22–21
|- bgcolor="#ccffcc"
| 44
| January 24
| Washington
| 
| Amar'e Stoudemire (30)
| Amar'e Stoudemire (9)
| Raymond Felton (15)
| Madison Square Garden19,763
| 23–21
|- bgcolor="#ccffcc"
| 45
| January 27
| Miami
| 
| Amar'e Stoudemire (24)
| Landry Fields (13)
| Raymond Felton (7)
| Madison Square Garden19,763
| 24–21
|- bgcolor="#ffcccc"
| 46
| January 28
| @ Atlanta
| 
| Amar'e Stoudemire (27)
| Shawne Williams (11)
| Raymond Felton (13)
| Philips Arena19,069
| 24–22
|- bgcolor="#ccffcc"
| 47
| January 30
| Detroit
| 
| Amar'e Stoudemire (33)
| Timofey Mozgov (14)
| Raymond Felton (5)
| Madison Square Garden19,763
| 25–22
|-

|- bgcolor="#ffcccc"
| 48
| February 2
| Dallas
| 
| Danilo Gallinari (27)
| Landry Fields (9)
| Raymond Felton (9)
| Madison Square Garden19,763
| 25–23
|- bgcolor="#ffcccc"
| 49
| February 4
| @ Philadelphia
| 
| Raymond Felton (26)
| Danilo Gallinari (13)
| Raymond Felton (9)
| Wells Fargo Center18,823
| 25–24
|- bgcolor="#ccffcc"
| 50
| February 6
| Philadelphia
| 
| Amar'e Stoudemire (41)
| Landry Fields (10)
| Raymond Felton (13)
| Madison Square Garden19,763
| 26–24
|- bgcolor="#ffcccc"
| 51
| February 9
| L.A. Clippers
| 
| Amar'e Stoudemire (23)
| Landry Fields,Timofey Mozgov (6)
| Raymond Felton (12)
| Madison Square Garden19,763
| 26–25
|- bgcolor="#ffcccc"
| 52
| February 11
| L.A. Lakers
| 
| Amar'e Stoudemire (24)
| Timofey Mozgov (11)
| Raymond Felton (7)
| Madison Square Garden19,763
| 26–26
|- bgcolor="#ccffcc"
| 53
| February 12
| @ New Jersey
| 
| Wilson Chandler (21)
| Wilson Chandler,Danilo Gallinari (8)
| Raymond Felton (11)
| Prudential Center18,711
| 27–26
|- bgcolor="#ccffcc"
| 54
| February 16
| Atlanta
| 
| Amar'e Stoudemire (23)
| Landry Fields,Danilo Gallinari (9)
| Raymond Felton (11)
| Madison Square Garden19,763
| 28–26
|- align="center"
|colspan="9" bgcolor="#bbcaff"|All-Star Break 
|- bgcolor="#ccffcc"
| 55
| February 23
| Milwaukee
| 
| Carmelo Anthony (27)
| Carmelo Anthony (10)
| Chauncey Billups (8)
| Madison Square Garden19,763
| 29–26
|- bgcolor="#ffcccc"
| 56
| February 25
| @ Cleveland
| 
| Amar'e Stoudemire (31)
| Amar'e Stoudemire (11)
| Chauncey Billups (8)
| Quicken Loans Arena20,562
| 29–27
|- bgcolor="#ccffcc"
| 57
| February 27
| @ Miami
| 
| Carmelo Anthony (29)
| Amar'e Stoudemire (10)
| Shawne Williams (4)
| American Airlines Arena19,702
| 30–27
|-

|- bgcolor="#ffcccc"
| 58
| March 1
| @ Orlando
| 
| Chauncey Billups,Amar'e Stoudemire (30)
| Landry Fields (11)
| Chauncey Billups (6)
| Amway Center19,131
| 30–28
|- bgcolor="#ccffcc"
| 59
| March 2
| New Orleans
| 
| Toney Douglas,Amar'e Stoudemire (24)
| Anthony Carter,Amar'e Stoudemire (7)
| Toney Douglas (5)
| Madison Square Garden19,763
| 31–28
|- bgcolor="#ffcccc"
| 60
| March 4
| Cleveland
| 
| Amar'e Stoudemire (41)
| Amar'e Stoudemire (9)
| Toney Douglas (5)
| Madison Square Garden19,763
| 31–29
|- bgcolor="#ccffcc"
| 61
| March 6
| @ Atlanta
| 
| Amar'e Stoudemire (26)
| Carmelo Anthony,Amar'e Stoudemire (7)
| Carmelo Anthony,Toney Douglas (7)
| Philips Arena19,560
| 32–29
|- bgcolor="#ccffcc"
| 62
| March 7
| Utah
| 
| Carmelo Anthony (34)
| Jared Jeffries (6)
| Toney Douglas,Shelden Williams (6)
| Madison Square Garden19,763
| 33–29
|- bgcolor="#ccffcc"
| 63
| March 9
| @ Memphis
| 
| Carmelo Anthony (31)
| Landry Fields,Amar'e Stoudemire (6)
| Toney Douglas (10)
| FedExForum17,512
| 34–29
|- bgcolor="#ffcccc"
| 64
| March 10
| @ Dallas
| 
| Amar'e Stoudemire (36)
| Carmelo Anthony (10)
| Toney Douglas (8)
| American Airlines Center20,517
| 34–30
|- bgcolor="#ffcccc"
| 65
| March 13
| Indiana
| 
| Amar'e Stoudemire (28)
| Chauncey Billups,Amar'e Stoudemire (6)
| Chauncey Billups (4)
| Madison Square Garden19,763
| 34–31
|- bgcolor="#ffcccc"
| 66
| March 15
| @ Indiana
| 
| Carmelo Anthony (29)
| Amar'e Stoudemire (10)
| Chauncey Billups,Landry Fields (5)
| Conseco Fieldhouse14,164
| 34–32
|- bgcolor="#ccffcc"
| 67
| March 17
| Memphis
| 
| Toney Douglas (29)
| Amar'e Stoudemire (9)
| Chauncey Billups (8)
| Madison Square Garden19,763
| 35–32
|- bgcolor="#ffcccc"
| 68
| March 18
| @ Detroit
| 
| Toney Douglas,Amar'e Stoudemire (20)
| Amar'e Stoudemire (12)
| Toney Douglas (11)
| The Palace of Auburn Hills22,076
| 35–33
|- bgcolor="#ffcccc"
| 69
| March 20
| @ Milwaukee
| 
| Amar'e Stoudemire (25)
| Amar'e Stoudemire (11)
| Toney Douglas (9)
| Bradley Center18,052
| 35–34
|- bgcolor="#ffcccc"
| 70
| March 21
| Boston
| 
| Carmelo Anthony (22)
| Amar'e Stoudemire (11)
| Toney Douglas (4)
| Madison Square Garden19,763
| 35–35
|- bgcolor="#ffcccc"
| 71
| March 23
| Orlando
| 
| Carmelo Anthony (24)
| Amar'e Stoudemire (7)
| Carmelo Anthony (9)
| Madison Square Garden19,763
| 35–36
|- bgcolor="#ffcccc"
| 72
| March 25
| Milwaukee
| 
| Amar'e Stoudemire (28)
| Amar'e Stoudemire (9)
| Chauncey Billups (4)
| Madison Square Garden19,763
| 35–37
|- bgcolor="#ffcccc"
| 73
| March 26
| @ Charlotte
| 
| Carmelo Anthony (36)
| Shelden Williams (9)
| Chauncey Billups (10)
| Time Warner Cable Arena19,356
| 35–38
|- bgcolor="#ccffcc"
| 74
| March 28
| Orlando
| 
| Carmelo Anthony (39)
| Carmelo Anthony (10)
| Chauncey Billups (6)
| Madison Square Garden19,763
| 36–38
|- bgcolor="#ccffcc"
| 75
| March 30
| New Jersey
| 
| Carmelo Anthony (39)
| Carmelo Anthony (10)
| Chauncey Billups (6)
| Madison Square Garden19,763
| 37–38
|-

|- bgcolor="#ccffcc"
| 76
| April 3
| Cleveland
| 
| Amar'e Stoudemire (28)
| Amar'e Stoudemire (7)
| Chauncey Billups (7)
| Madison Square Garden19,763
| 38–38
|- bgcolor="#ccffcc"
| 77
| April 5
| Toronto
| 
| Toney Douglas (28)
| Carmelo Anthony (9)
| Chauncey Billups (9)
| Madison Square Garden19,763
| 39–38
|- bgcolor="#ccffcc"
| 78
| April 6
| @ Philadelphia
| 
| Carmelo Anthony (31)
| Carmelo Anthony (11)
| Amar'e Stoudemire (7)
| Wells Fargo Center18,375
| 40–38
|- bgcolor="#ccffcc"
| 79
| April 8
| @ New Jersey
| 
| Carmelo Anthony (25)
| Carmelo Anthony (14)
| Toney Douglas (9)
| Prudential Center18,023
| 41–38
|- bgcolor="#ccffcc"
| 80
| April 10
| @ Indiana
| 
| Carmelo Anthony (34)
| Landry Fields (7)
| Chauncey Billups (7)
| Conseco Fieldhouse13,542
| 42–38
|- bgcolor="#ffcccc"
| 81
| April 12
| Chicago
| 
| Carmelo Anthony (21)
| Carmelo Anthony,Toney Douglas (5)
| Chauncey Billups (8)
| Madison Square Garden19,763
| 42–39
|- bgcolor="#ffcccc"
| 82
| April 13
| @ Boston
| 
| Landry Fields (16)
| Landry Fields (7)
| Anthony Carter (6)
| TD Garden18,624
| 42–40
|-

Playoffs

Game log

|- bgcolor=ffcccc
| 1
| April 17
| @ Boston
| 
| Amar'e Stoudemire (28)
| Amar'e Stoudemire (11)
| Carmelo Anthony,Chauncey Billups (4)
| TD Garden18,624
| 0–1
|- bgcolor=ffcccc
| 2
| April 19
| @ Boston
| 
| Carmelo Anthony (42)
| Carmelo Anthony (17)
| Carmelo Anthony (6)
| TD Garden18,624
| 0–2
|- bgcolor=ffcccc
| 3
| April 22
| Boston
| 
| Shawne Williams (17)
| Carmelo Anthony (11)
| Carmelo Anthony (6)
| Madison Square Garden19,763
| 0–3
|- bgcolor=ffcccc
| 4
| April 24
| Boston
| 
| Carmelo Anthony (32)
| Amar'e Stoudemire (12)
| Anthony Carter (4)
| Madison Square Garden19,763
| 0–4
|-

Player statistics

Season stats

|- align="center" bgcolor=""
| * || 27 || 27 || 36.2 || .461 || .424 || .872 || 6.7 || 3.0 || .93 || .56 || style="background:#ff8c00;"| 26.3
|- align="center" bgcolor="#f0f0f0"
| * || 3 || 0 || 6.0 || .250 || .500 || .0 || 1.0 || 0.0 || .33 || .0 || 1.0
|- align="center" bgcolor=""
| * || 21 || 21 || 31.6 || .403 || .328 || .902 || 3.1 || 5.5 || .90 || .10 || 17.5
|- align="center" bgcolor="#f0f0f0"
| * || 7 || 0 || 9.4 || style="background:#ff8c00;"| .818 || style="background:#ff8c00;"| 1.000 || .538 || 1.1 || 0.3 || .14 || .14 || 3.9
|- align="center" bgcolor=""
| * || 18 || 0 || 16.1 || .444 || .269 || style="background:#ff8c00;"| 1.000 || 2.1 || 2.1 || .94 || .22 || 4.2
|- align="center" bgcolor="#f0f0f0"
| * || 51 || 30 || 34.5 || .461 || .351 || .807 || 5.9 || 1.7 || .67 || 1.37 || 16.4
|- align="center" bgcolor=""
|  || 80 || 8 || 24.3 || .416 || .375 || .792 || 3.0 || 3.0 || 1.09 || .05 || 10.6
|- align="center" bgcolor="#f0f0f0"
| * || 54 || 54 || style="background:#ff8c00;"| 38.4 || .423 || .328 || .867 || 3.6 || style="background:#ff8c00;"| 9.0 || style="background:#ff8c00;"| 1.80 || .20 || 17.1
|- align="center" bgcolor=""
|  || style="background:#ff8c00;"| 81 || style="background:#ff8c00;"| 80 || 31.0 || .497 || .393 || .771 || 6.3 || 1.9 || .99 || .21 || 9.6
|- align="center" bgcolor="#f0f0f0"
| * || 48 || 48 || 34.8 || .415 || .347 || .893 || 4.8 || 1.7 || .79 || .37 || 15.9
|- align="center" bgcolor=""
| * || 23 || 9 || 19.4 || .378 || .333 || .412 || 3.4 || 1.1 || 1.00 || .57 || 1.8
|- align="center" bgcolor="#f0f0f0"
|  || 25 || 0 || 11.5 || .338 || .385 || .667 || 1.5 || 0.6 || .24 || .08 || 2.7
|- align="center" bgcolor=""
| * || 34 || 14 || 13.5 || .464 || .0 || .705 || 3.1 || 0.4 || .41 || .68 || 4.0
|- align="center" bgcolor="#f0f0f0"
| * || 17 || 0 || 7.5 || .311 || .250 || .500 || 2.4 || 0.4 || .24 || .47 || 2.1
|- align="center" bgcolor=""
|  || 5 || 0 || 4.8 || .429 || .250 || .500 || 0.2 || 0.6 || .20 || .0 || 1.6
|- align="center" bgcolor="#f0f0f0"
|  || 77 || 77 || 37.0 || .503 || .435 || .793 || style="background:#ff8c00;"| 8.2 || 2.6 || .92 || style="background:#ff8c00;"| 1.94 || 25.4
|- align="center" bgcolor=""
|  || 63 || 20 || 17.9 || .627 || .0 || .622 || 3.2 || 1.4 || .56 || 1.16 || 4.1
|- align="center" bgcolor="#f0f0f0"
|  || 63 || 11 || 26.0 || .427 || .405 || .833 || 3.8 || 0.7 || .60 || .79 || 7.1
|- align="center" bgcolor="f0f0f0"
| * || 16 || 6 || 11.8 || .543 || .0 || .815 || 3.1 || 0.8 || .31 || .25 || 3.8
|}
As of April 12.
* – Stats with the Knicks.

Playoffs

Awards, records and milestones

Awards
On November 22, Amar'e Stoudemire was named Eastern Conference Player of the Week (November 15–November 21).
On December 6, Amar'e Stoudemire was named Eastern Conference Player of the Week (November 24-December 3).
On December 1, Landry Fields was named Eastern Conference Rookie of the Month (October 26 though November)
On January 3, Landry Fields was named Eastern Conference Rookie of the Month (Games played through December)

Records

Milestones

Injuries and surgeries

Transactions

Trades

Free agents

Additions

Subtractions

References

New York Knicks seasons
New York
New York Knicks
New York Knicks
2010s in Manhattan
Madison Square Garden